Mike Gibbs + Twelve play Gil Evans is an album by composer Mike Gibbs. It was released on 12 August 2013 on Whirlwind Recordings.

Track listing

 "Bilbao Song" (Kurt Weill) (as arranged by Gil Evans)
 "Las Vegas Tango" (Gil Evans)
 "Ida Lupino" (Carla Bley)
 "Feelings & Things" (Michael Gibbs)
 "Sister Sadie" (Horace Silver) (as arranged by Gil Evans)
 "Spring is Here" (Richard Rodgers, Lorenz Hart) (as arranged by Gil Evans)
 "Ramblin’" (Ornette Coleman)
 "St. Louis Blues" (W.C. Handy) (as arranged by Gil Evans)
 "Tennis, Anyone?" (Michael Gibbs)
 "Wait till You See Her" (Richard Rodgers, Lorenz Hart) (as arranged by Gil Evans)

Personnel
 Mike Gibbs - Arranger and conductor
 Finn Peters - Alto Saxophone, Flutes
 Julian Siegel - Tenor & Soprano Saxophones, Bass Clarinet
 Lluis Mather - Tenor Saxophone, Clarinets
 Percy Pursglove, Robbie Robson, Joe Aukland - Trumpet
 Jim Rattigan - French horn
 Mark Nightingale - Trombone
 Sarah Williams - Bass trombone, tuba
  Hans Koller - Piano
 Michael Janisch - Double bass
 Jeff Williams - Drums

Production
 Produced by Mike Gibbs, Hans Koller, Michael Janisch & Alex Bonney
 Engineer: Alex Bonney
 Edited by Alex Bonney, March 2013
 Mixed & Mastered by Tyler McDiarmid, NYC March 2013
 Executive Producer - Michael Janisch

References

2013 albums